Alexander Lee may refer to:
Alexander Lee (priest) (died 1503), Canon of Windsor
Alexander Sebastien Lee ( 2008), American actor
Alexander Lee (entertainer) (born 1988), singer, actor and host in South Korea

See also
Alex Lee (disambiguation)
Alexander Lees (disambiguation)
Lee Alexander (disambiguation)